David C. Jordan was the United States Ambassador to Peru from March 20, 1984, to July 17, 1986.

Career
Jordan was nominated by Ronald Reagan after teaching at Pennsylvania State University (1964-1965) and the University of Virginia beginning in 1965.

Jordan has written numerous books including Drug Politics and Revolutionary Cuba and the End of the Cold War.

He retired from teaching comparative government and international relations at the University of Virginia in 2011.

References
 
 

Ambassadors of the United States to Peru
Living people
1935 births
Harvard University alumni
University of Virginia School of Law alumni
University of Pennsylvania alumni
People from Chicago